Radwanice  is a village in Polkowice County, Lower Silesian Voivodeship, in south-western Poland. It is the seat of the administrative district (gmina) called Gmina Radwanice.

The village has a population of 2,100.

References

Radwanice